Tomasz Antoni Wawrzecki (1753–1816) was a distinguished Polish-Lithuanian politician and military commander.

Early life 
Wawrzecki was a judge in the Lithuanian Tribunal in 1778, 1782 and 1784.

Great Sejm (1788–1792) 
During the Four-Year Sejm, Wawrzecki belonged to the Patriotic Party. In 1790, in his manor in  near Kruonis, he replaced serfdom with contractual agreements.

On 17 May 1790, Wawrzecki, Matheus Butrymowicz, Jacek Jezierski and Ignacy Wyssogota Zakrzewski all condemned attacks against the Jewish population of Warsaw. Wawrziecki was of the opinion that Jews should have equal rights, however, this was motivated by the desire to make them socio-culturally resemble Poles more.

Together with others, Wawrziecki contributed to writing the Constitution of 3 May 1791 and also initiated the foundation of civilian and military administrative commissions. Wawrzecki was Grand Standard-bearer of Lithuania.

Kościuszko Uprising 
From 12 May to October 12, Wawrzecki commanded the Samogitian Division. In 1794, Wawrzecki gave his peasants personal freedom.

After Tadeusz Kościuszko was captured in the Battle of Maciejowice on October 10, lieutenant general Tomasz Wawrzecki was named his successor. After Warsaw was taken over by the Russian Empire following the Battle of Praga, he retreated with the remnants of his forces southwards. On November 18, Wawrzecki was taken prisoner by the Imperial Russian Army in Radoszyce. On November 22, the captured senior officers that signed an assurance that they would not fight against Catherine II of Russia were released, however Wawrzecki did not sign it and was thus sent to Saint Petersburg. Wawrzecki's surrender to the Imperial Russian Army on 16 November 1794 marked the effective end of the uprising. Wawrzecki was imprisoned in Petropavlovsk fortress in 1794, but was amnestied in 1796 by Paul I of Russia.

Later life 
In 1807, he replaced his peasants' corvée with quit-rent. Wawrzecki was the head of the second section of the Vilnius Charity Society that was established in 1807.

In March 1813, a Temporary Council for a new government in the Russian-conquered Duchy of Warsaw was created. It consisted of Tomasz Wawrzecki, Adam Jerzy Czartoryski, Nikolay Novosiltsev and Franciszek Ksawery Drucki-Lubecki. Wawrzecki was the chairman of the Commission of Justice of the Duchy of Warsaw in 1813–15. On 20 June 1815, when the Kingdom of Poland was re-created as a Russian puppet state, Wawrzecki delivered a speech praising Tsar Alexander I of Russia and Grand Duke Konstantin Pavlovich of Russia. Wawrzecki was the Justice minister of the Kingdom of Poland in 1815–16 and proposed that the Lithuanian Statutes should be the new law in the Kingdom of Poland, as he thought that the Lithuanian Statutes were better than the Napoleonic Code. Wawrzecki was part of conservative Lithuanian nobility that opposed keeping of the Napoleonic Code within Congress Poland. He died on 5 August 1816 in Vidzy, then part of the Russian Empire's Lithuania-Vilnius Governorate, but now in Belarus.

Awards 

 Order of Saint Stanislaus in 1786.
 Order of the White Eagle in 1791.

References

Sources

External links
 Wawrzecki's tomb

1753 births
1816 deaths
People from Ignalina District Municipality
People from Vilnius Voivodeship
Generals of the Polish–Lithuanian Commonwealth
Generals of the Kościuszko Uprising
Kościuszko insurgents
Members of the Great Sejm
Government officials of Congress Poland
Recipients of the Order of the White Eagle (Poland)
Prisoners of the Peter and Paul Fortress